At Donington UK: Live 1983 & 1987 is a live album from American heavy metal band Dio. It was released on November 9, 2010  as the first release from Dio's Niji Entertainment Group label.  It features two appearances by Dio at the Monsters of Rock festival at Donington: the 1983 show and the 1987 show (from the Holy Diver and Dream Evil tours, respectively). In addition to his work with his own band, material from Ronnie James Dio's time in Black Sabbath and Rainbow is also showcased.
Much of the material on these two discs is included as bonus tracks on the deluxe expanded editions of Holy Diver and Dream Evil, released in 2012 and 2013 respectively.

Reception

Blabbermouth.net reviewed the album, giving it a score of 8/10 and saying that the album "...is a terrific performance document from DIO's performances at the Monsters of Rock festivals. Nothing shabby or thrown-together here, the two-disc set exudes all the power and glory of a larger-than-life (figuratively speaking) heavy metal icon at the top of his game...".

Greg Moffitt at BBC music gave the album a positive review calling it a  "great souvenir of Dio’s halcyon days and a fitting tribute to a true legend."

Track listing

Personnel
Ronnie James Dio - vocals
Vivian Campbell - guitar (on disc 1)
Craig Goldy - guitar (on disc 2)
Claude Schnell - keyboards
Jimmy Bain - bass
Vinny Appice - drums

Charts

References 

2010 live albums
Dio (band) albums